Pyotr Osipovich Karyshkovskij-Ikar (March 12, 1921, Odessa – March 6, 1988, Odessa) - Ukrainian Soviet historian, numismatist, a scholar and lexicographer.

Doctor of Historical Sciences, professor, since 1963 and until his last days he headed the department of ancient history and medieval Odessa University.

Biography 

In 1945 he graduated from the Faculty of History of Odessa University. In 1946–1948 he was a graduate student of World History (Ancient and Byzantine History). In 1951 Peter Osipovich completed his master's thesis (Political relations between the Byzantine Empire, Bulgaria and Russia in the years 967–971) and at the same time began to publish articles in journals Questions of History, Byzantine chronicle, Journal of Ancient History on Russian-Byzantine relations in the 10th century.

Over time, his research interests changed, and he became a researcher of antiquity, especially on the history and culture of the Northern Black Sea and the city of Byzantium. He published about 180 papers, of which the most significant focus on epigraphy and numismatics - especially the coins of Olbia, which Karyshkovskij-Ikar defended in his 1968 doctoral dissertation on Coinage and Monetary Circulation in Olbia (6th century B.C. – 4th century A.D.).

Continuing to work at the Odessa State University, Karyshkovskij-Ikar read various courses of lectures, often the history of Ancient Greece and Rome. Extensive knowledge and erudition enabled him over the years to lecture at the History Department of the six historical courses, six specialized disciplines and to develop a lot of special courses on ancient and medieval history, the course "Introduction to" Numismatics and others.

The depth of research of Peter Osipovitch was to a large extent because he had a perfect command of many languages: English, German, Italian, Romanian, Polish, Czech, Bulgarian, Serbian, Latin and ancient Greek.

Karyshkovskij-Ikar was elected a corresponding member of the German Archaeological Institute, the American Numismatic Society, and was a founding member of the Odessa Archaeological Society.

He was honoured by his native Odessa, which gave his name to a street of the city.

Works 

  Coins of Olbia: Essay of Monetary Circulation of the North-western Black Sea Region in Antique Epoch. Киев, 1988. .
Coinage and Monetary Circulation in Olbia (6th  century B.C. – 4th century A.D.) Odessa (2003). .
 The City of Tyras. A Historical and Archaeological Essay. Одесса: Polis-Press, 1994)..   
 Bibliography

1921 births
1988 deaths
20th-century Ukrainian historians
Historians of the Balkans
Historians of the Middle East
Numismatists
Odessa Archaeological School
Odesa University alumni
Academic staff of Odesa University
Soviet medievalists
Ukrainian Byzantinists
Ukrainian classical scholars
Ukrainian archaeologists
Ukrainian medievalists
20th-century archaeologists
Scholars of Byzantine history